Boldyn Sansarbileg (born April 12, 1976 in Beijing, China) is a Mongolian short track speed skater. Sansarbileg represented Mongolia at the 1998 Winter Olympics in Nagano along with fellow short track speed skater Battulgyn Oktyabri. Sansarbileg, the flagbearer for Mongolia at the Olympics, competed at the men's 1000 metres and placed 4th in his heat without advancing to the second round. He placed 29th of the 30 skaters to have competed in the 1000 m event, finishing the distance in a time of 1:39.913.

References

1976 births
Living people
Mongolian male short track speed skaters
Olympic short track speed skaters of Mongolia
Short track speed skaters at the 1998 Winter Olympics
Short track speed skaters at the 1999 Asian Winter Games
20th-century Mongolian people